Asturian refers to something related to Asturias, in northern Spain:

 Asturians, the people of that region
 Asturian language
 Asturian cuisine, cuisine of the Asturias region of Spain

See also
 Asturian culture of the Epipalaeolithic or Mesolithic Stone Age
 Asturcón, also known as an Asturian pony

Language and nationality disambiguation pages